NGC 5640 is a spiral galaxy approximately 660 million light-years away from Earth in the constellation of Camelopardalis. It was discovered by British astronomer William Herschel on December 20, 1797.

Supernova SN 1996ah 
Supernova SN 1996ah was discovered in NGC 5640 on June 6, 1996 by J. Mueller, who was using the 1.2-m Oschin Schmidt telescope in the course of the second Palomar Sky Survey.

SN 1996ah had magnitude about 18 and was located southwest of the centre of NGC 5640 (coordinates: RA 14h20m39.020s, DEC +80d07m21.00s, J2000.0). It was classified as type Ia supernova.

See also 
 List of NGC objects (5001–6000)

References

External links 

 
 SEDS

Spiral galaxies
Camelopardalis (constellation)
5640
51263
Astronomical objects discovered in 1797
Discoveries by William Herschel